Jefferson County is a county in the U.S. state of Nebraska. As of the 2020 United States Census, the population was 7,240. Its county seat is Fairbury. The county was named for Thomas Jefferson, third President of the United States of America.

In the Nebraska license plate system, Jefferson County is represented by the prefix 33 (it had the thirty-third-largest number of vehicles registered in the county when the license plate system was established in 1922).

History
Jefferson County was founded on 26 January 1856, and its governing structure was organized in 1864. It was named for Thomas Jefferson, third president of the United States.

In 2010, the Keystone-Cushing Pipeline (Phase II) was constructed south out of Jefferson County.

Geography
Jefferson County lies on the south line of Nebraska. Its south boundary line abuts the north boundary line of the state of Kansas. The terrain of Jefferson County consists of low rolling hills, whose leveled tops are largely used for agriculture. The Little Blue River flows southeastward through the southwestern-middle of the county.

Major highways

  U.S. Highway 136
  Nebraska Highway 4
  Nebraska Highway 8
  Nebraska Highway 15
  Nebraska Highway 103

Protected areas

 Alexandria State Recreation Area
 Buckley State Recreation Area
 Rock Creek Station State Historical Park
 Rock Glen State Wildlife Management Area

Adjacent counties

 Saline County - north
 Gage County - east
 Washington County, Kansas - south
 Republic County, Kansas - southwest
 Thayer County - west
 Fillmore County - northwest

Demographics

As of the 2000 United States Census, there were 8,333 people, 3,527 households, and 2,352 families in the county. The population density was 14 people per square mile (6/km2). There were 3,942 housing units at an average density of 7 per square mile (3/km2). The racial makeup of the county was 98.42% White, 0.07% Black or African American, 0.38% Native American, 0.17% Asian, 0.04% Pacific Islander, 0.50% from other races, and 0.42% from two or more races. 1.31% of the population were Hispanic or Latino of any race.

There were 3,527 households, out of which 28.00% had children under the age of 18 living with them, 57.90% were married couples living together, 5.80% had a female householder with no husband present, and 33.30% were non-families. 29.60% of all households were made up of individuals, and 17.20% had someone living alone who was 65 years of age or older. The average household size was 2.32 and the average family size was 2.85.

The county population contained 23.30% under the age of 18, 6.10% from 18 to 24, 23.70% from 25 to 44, 24.30% from 45 to 64, and 22.70% who were 65 years of age or older. The median age was 43 years. For every 100 females there were 95.60 males. For every 100 females age 18 and over, there were 91.80 males.

The median income for a household in the county was $32,629, and the median income for a family was $40,747. Males had a median income of $26,929 versus $18,594 for females. The per capita income for the county was $18,380. About 8.00% of families and 8.90% of the population were below the poverty line, including 10.20% of those under age 18 and 8.70% of those age 65 or over.

Communities

City 

 Fairbury (county seat)

Villages 

 Daykin
 Diller
 Endicott
 Harbine
 Jansen
 Plymouth
 Reynolds
 Steele City

Unincorporated communities 

 Gladstone
 Helvey
 Powell
 Thompson

Politics
Jefferson County is strongly Republican, having only backed the Democratic Party presidential candidate four times since 1900, all in years which the party won nationally by a landslide.

See also
 National Register of Historic Places listings in Jefferson County, Nebraska
 Oto Reservation

References

External links

 
Nebraska counties
1864 establishments in Nebraska Territory
Populated places established in 1864